Scott Chase Gregory (born July 31, 1959 in Auburn, New York) is an American former competitive ice dancer. He competed at the 1984 Winter Olympics with Elisa Spitz. He then paired with Suzanne Semanick, with whom he won the gold medal at the U.S. Figure Skating Championships twice and competed at the Olympics in 1988.  He retired from skating that year due to back injuries.

Gregory is married to former figure skater Pam Gregory, who now coaches Kimmie Meissner. Scott Gregory was born and raised in Skaneateles, New York.

Results

With Elisa Spitz

With Suzanne Semanick

References

Navigation

American male ice dancers
Olympic figure skaters of the United States
Figure skaters at the 1984 Winter Olympics
Figure skaters at the 1988 Winter Olympics
1959 births
Living people